Google Tasks is a task management application developed by Google and included with Google Workspace. 

Included initially as a feature in Gmail and Google Calendar, Google Tasks launched as a core product with a standalone app in 2018. It is available for Android and iOS, as well as in the right-hand side panel on Google Workspace apps on the web.

History and development
Google Tasks began as an integration within other apps in G Suite (now Google Workspace), allowing to-do items to be created in Calendar and Gmail. Upon graduating to a core service on June 28, 2018, Google Tasks launched as a dedicated mobile app in which tasks can be sorted into lists, managed, and completed. Google Tasks launched the ability to create tasks from Google Chat messages in 2022.

See also 
 Microsoft To Do

References

Google software
Android (operating system) software
IOS software